Usama Basharat (born 11 November 1989) is a Pakistani cricketer. He played in six first-class and fourteen List A matches between 2009 and 2018.

References

External links
 

1989 births
Living people
Pakistani cricketers
Karachi cricketers
Sui Southern Gas Company cricketers
Cricketers from Karachi
Karachi Whites cricketers